Dead Famous may refer to:
 Dead Famous (novel), a 2001 comedy/mystery book by Ben Elton
 Dead Famous (TV series), a television series about the paranormal, presented by Gail Porter
 Dead Famous, a novel in the Mallory series by Carol O'Connell